The following is a list of FIU Panthers men's basketball head coaches. There have been nine head coaches of the Panthers in their 42-season history.

Cincinnati's current head coach is Jeremy Ballard. He was hired as the Panthers' head coach in April 2018, replacing Anthony Evans, who was fired after the 2017–18 season.

References

FIU

FIU Panthers men's basketball coaches